

The Prudden-Whitehead monoplane (sometimes referred to as the Atlanta PW-1, PW-2 or the Prudden monoplane) is an American three-engined eight-seat commercial transport monoplane. Built by the Atlanta Aircraft Corporation and designed by George H. Prudden, Edward Whitehead was responsible for the sales of the aircraft.

Design and development
The Prudden-Whitehead monoplane is an all-metal low-wing cantilever monoplane with a monocoque fuselage and powered by three  Wright R-760 piston engines. It has a conventional fixed landing gear with a tailwheel. It has an enclosed passenger cabin for eight to ten passengers and a washroom and toilet. Only two of the trimotors were built.

Variants
PW-1
The first aircraft built registered N366W.
PW-2
The second aircraft built registered N280V.

Specifications

References

Notes

External links
 

1930s United States airliners
Trimotors
Atlanta Aircraft aircraft
Low-wing aircraft
Aircraft first flown in 1930